Magdalena Stefanowicz (born 21 September 2000) is a Polish athlete. She competed at the 2021 World Athletics Relays, winning the silver medal in the women's 4 × 100 metres relay event.

References

External links
 

2000 births
Living people
Polish female sprinters
Place of birth missing (living people)
21st-century Polish women
European Athletics Championships medalists